Judith Marilyn Maddigan (born 3 February 1948), Australian politician, was Speaker of the Victorian Legislative Assembly from 2003 to 2005. She was the member for the seat of Essendon from 1996 to 2010, representing the Labor Party.

Maddigan was born in Melbourne, and was educated at Tintern Grammar and the University of Melbourne. She was a librarian before entering politics. She was the first woman Speaker of the Legislative Assembly.

References

External links

1948 births
Living people
Australian Labor Party members of the Parliament of Victoria
Members of the Victorian Legislative Assembly
Speakers of the Victorian Legislative Assembly
21st-century Australian politicians
21st-century Australian women politicians
Women members of the Victorian Legislative Assembly
Politicians from Melbourne
University of Melbourne alumni politicians